The 122nd Pennsylvania House of Representatives District is coterminous with Carbon County and has been represented by Doyle Heffley since 2011.

Representatives

McCall did not seek re-election in 2010. Republicans won numerous Democratic seats in Pennsylvania in 2010, including Keith McCall's.

On November 4, 2008, Keith McCall won re-election to the 122nd District seat of the Pennsylvania House of Representatives. He received 16,981 votes, defeating Republican Doyle Heffley (9,549).[2]

Recent election results

References

External links
District Map from the United States Census Bureau
Pennsylvania House Legislative District Maps from the Pennsylvania Redistricting Commission.
Population Date for District 45 from the Pennsylvania Redistricting Commission.

Government of Carbon County, Pennsylvania
122